William Mark Duke (October 7, 1879 – August 31, 1971) was a Canadian prelate of the Roman Catholic Church, who served as Archbishop of Vancouver from 1931 to 1964.

Biography
Born in Saint John, New Brunswick, on October 7, 1879.

Ordination
William Duke was ordained to the priesthood at age 23 on June 29, 1903.

Consecration
He was appointed Coadjutor Archbishop of Vancouver and Titular Bishop of Phasis by Pope Pius XI on August 10, 1928. He received his episcopal consecration on the following October 18 from Archbishop Timothy Casey. Duke later succeeded the late Archbishop Casey as full Archbishop of Vancouver on October 5, 1931.

Legacy
 He founded St. Mark's College, a Catholic Theological College in affiliation with the University of British Columbia.
 He helped found Notre Dame Regional Secondary School, a Catholic high school for Vancouver (eastside) & Burnaby.
 He helped found St. Thomas Aquinas Regional Secondary School, a Catholic high school for North Vancouver.
 Helped found St. Vincent's Hospital, Vancouver which was administered by the Sisters of Charity. The hospital provided Catholic health care on August 12, 1939. The Hospital was closed on March 1, 2003.
 He founded The B.C. Catholic newspaper, the official newspaper of the Archdiocese of Vancouver.
 Mount Duke was named after him in 1966.

Service to God
 Priest for 68 years 
 Bishop for 43 years

Notes

He attended the Second Vatican Council from 1962 to 1965. The Archbishop was a "strict disciplinarian", and was also known as the "Iron Duke". He was opposed to Sunday picnics, dances, alcohol, and Marxism, and once said of bathing beauty contests, "It lowers the dignity and esteem due to women to parade them and measure them ... like cattle." However, Duke was dedicated to vocations, establishing parishes and parochial schools.

On October 30, 1953, he received the degree of Doctor of Laws, (honoris causa) from the University of British Columbia.

On October 1, 1968, he received the Freedom of the City Award from the Vancouver City Council.

He retired as Vancouver's archbishop on March 11, 1964, after thirty-two years of service. Upon his retirement, Duke was appointed Titular Archbishop of Seleucia in Isauria. He died seven years later, on August 31, 1971, at the age of 91.

References

External links
Archdiocese of Vancouver
 Archdiocese of Vancouver former bishops

1879 births
1971 deaths
People from Saint John, New Brunswick
20th-century Roman Catholic archbishops in Canada
Participants in the Second Vatican Council
Roman Catholic archbishops of Vancouver